The EK Subdivision is a railroad line owned by CSX Transportation in the U.S. State of Kentucky. At its north end the line continues south from the CC Subdivision and at its south end the line continues south as the Rockhouse Subdivision.

See also
 List of CSX Transportation lines

References

CSX Transportation lines
Transportation in Clark County, Kentucky
Transportation in Perry County, Kentucky